The 1986 Los Angeles Dodgers finished the season in fifth place in the Western Division of the National League.

Regular season

Season standings

Record vs. opponents

Opening Day starters

Notable transactions
 April 10, 1986: César Cedeño was signed as a free agent by the Dodgers.
 June 5, 1986: César Cedeño was released by the Dodgers.
 July 31, 1986: Joe Beckwith was purchased by the  Dodgers from the Toronto Blue Jays.

Roster

Player stats

Batting

Starters by position
Note: Pos = Position; G = Games played; AB = At bats; H = Hits; Avg. = Batting average; HR = Home runs; RBI = Runs batted in

Other batters
Note: G = Games played; AB = At bats; H = Hits; Avg. = Batting average; HR = Home runs; RBI = Runs batted in

Pitching

Starting pitchers
Note: G = Games pitched; IP = Innings pitched; W = Wins; L = Losses; ERA = Earned run average; SO = Strikeouts

Other pitchers
Note: G = Games pitched; IP = Innings pitched; W = Wins; L = Losses; ERA = Earned run average; SO = Strikeouts

Relief pitchers
Note: G = Games pitched; W = Wins; L = Losses; SV = Saves; ERA = Earned run average; SO = Strikeouts

1986 Awards
1986 Major League Baseball All-Star Game
Steve Sax reserve
Fernando Valenzuela reserve
Gold Glove Award
Fernando Valenzuela
Silver Slugger Award
Steve Sax
TSN National League All-Star
Steve Sax
Fernando Valenzuela
NL Player of the Month
Steve Sax (September 1986)
NL Player of the Week
Fernando Valenzuela (Apr. 28 – May 4)
Fernando Valenzuela (May 19–25)
Franklin Stubbs (July 14–20)
Orel Hershiser (July 28 – Aug. 3)

Farm system 

Teams in BOLD won League Championships

Major League Baseball Draft

The Dodgers drafted 39 players in the June draft and 19 in the January draft. Of those, seven players would eventually play in the Major Leagues.

The Dodgers first round pick in the June draft was outfielder Michael White from Loudon High School in Loudon, Tennessee. In seven seasons of professional baseball (six of them in the Dodgers system), he hit .277 with 12 homers and 217 RBI.  

The most notable pick in the draft was infielder Dave Hansen, selected in the 2nd round out of Rowland High School in California. Hansen played in the Majors from 1990–2007, and was one of the more accomplished pinch hitters in league history. He hit .260 with 35 homers and 222 RBI. After his playing career he became a Major League hitting coach.

References

External links 
1986 Los Angeles Dodgers uniform
Los Angeles Dodgers official web site
Baseball-Reference season page
Baseball Almanac season page

Los Angeles Dodgers seasons
Los Angeles Dodgers
Los